Hurdia is an extinct genus of hurdiid radiodont that lived 505 million years ago during the Cambrian Period. As a radiodont like Peytoia and Anomalocaris, it is part of the ancestral lineage that led to euarthropods.

Description

Its head bore a pair of rake-like frontal appendages which shovelled food into its pineapple-ring-like mouth (oral cone). Like other hurdiids, Hurdia bore a large frontal carapace protruding from its head composed of three sclerites: a central component known as the H-element and two lateral components known as P-elements. The function of this organ remains mysterious; it cannot have been protective as there was no underlying soft tissue. Originally, it is estimated that body flaps ran along the sides of the organisms, from which large gills were suspended. However, anatomy of Aegirocassis clarified that Hurdia had both ventral and dorsal flaps, and gills were on trunk segments.

Ecology
Hurdia was a predator, or possibly a scavenger. Its frontal appendages are flimsier than those of Anomalocaris, suggesting that it fed on less robust prey.  It displayed a  cosmopolitan distribution; it has been recovered from the Burgess shale as well as sites in the US, China and Europe.

Taxonomic history

Hurdia was named in 1912 by Charles Walcott, with two species, the type species H. victoria and a referred species, H. triangulata. The genus name refers to Mount Hurd. It is possible that Walcott had described a specimen the year prior as Amiella, but the specimen is too fragmentary to identify with certainty, so Amiella is a nomen dubium. Walcott's original specimens consisted only of H-elements of the frontal carapace, which he interpreted as being the carapace of an unidentified type of crustacean. P-elements of the carapace were described as a separate genus, Proboscicaris, in 1962.

In 1996, then-curator of the Royal Ontario Museum Desmond H. Collins erected the taxon Radiodonta to encompass Anomalocaris and its close relatives, and included both Hurdia and Proboscicaris in the group. He subsequently recognized that Proboscicaris and Hurdia were based on different parts of the same animal, and recognized that a specimen previously assigned to Peytoia was also a specimen of the species. He presented his ideas in informal articles, and it was not until 2009, after three years of painstaking research, that the complete organism was reconstructed.

Sixty-nine specimens of Hurdia are known from the Greater Phyllopod bed, where they comprise 0.13% of the community.

References

External links
 

Dinocarida
Burgess Shale fossils
Cambrian arthropods
Anomalocaridids
Cambrian genus extinctions